Selçuk is a town in İzmir Province in the Aegean Region of Turkey.

Its previous Greek name, Agios Theologos (Άγιος Θεολόγος), referred to John the Theologian, because emperor Justinian had erected there a basilica in honour of the saint. Ayasoluk is a corrupted form of the original name. 
In the 14th century, it was the capital of the Beylik of Aydin, and visited by Ibn Battuta.  He noted, "The congregational mosque in this city is one of the most magnificent mosques in the world and unequaled in beauty."  Under the Ottoman Empire, it was known as Ayasoluk. In 1914, it was renamed Selçuk after the Seljuk Turks who first led incursions into the region in the 12th century.

 in Kuşadası district till 1957, when it became a district itself. Its neighbours are Torbalı from north, Tire from northeast, Germencik from east, Kuşadası from south, Aegean Sea from west and Menderes (formerly Cumaovası) from northwest.

Selçuk is one of the most visited tourist destinations within Turkey, known for its closeness to the ancient city of Ephesus, House of the Virgin Mary, and Seljuk works of art. The 6th century Basilica of St. John the Apostle, which, some claim, is built on the site of the Apostle's tomb, is also inside the town. Procopius said that the basilica was a most sacred and honoured place in Ephesus. It was severely damaged in the invasion of Selçuk Turks in 1090. The place was excavated in 1927, and Pope  Paul VI paid it a visit and prayed there.

In 1921, after the capture of the village by the Greek forces, the village had a total population of 600, ethnographically consisting of 580 Greeks, 10 Turks and 10 Armenians.

The old quarter of Selçuk retains much traditional Turkish culture. Ayasuluk Hill dominates the surrounding area, with several historical buildings on its slopes, including the İsa Bey Mosque built by the Aydinids in 1375, and the Grand Fortress. The hill itself is part of Ephesus UNESCO World Heritage Site.

Ephesus Beach (Turkish: Pamucak) is one of the longest beaches (12 km) in Turkey and hosts five large hotels.

Sport
The youth football teams of the İzmir-based sports club Altınordu S.K. play their home matches in the Altınordu Selçuk-Efes Football Complex, which is located WSW of Selçuk. With five football fields, the venue is the largest in İzmir Province.

Notable people
Bülent Cevahir (1992–), footballer
Hafsa Hatun (before 1380 – after 1403), wife of Sultan Bayezid I of the Ottoman Empire

International relations

Twin towns – sister cities
Selçuk is twinned with:

 Dion, Greece
 Kobuleti, Georgia
 Lienz, Austria
 Ourém, Portugal
 Radoviš, North Macedonia
 Siegburg, Germany

See also 

Temple of Artemis
Şirince

References

External links 

  Selçuk District, governmental site

 Şirince Travel Guide
 Selcuk places to visit
 Pictures of Selçuk
 Şirince Accommodation Guide
 Images of Selçuk Ayasoluk
 Selçuk Guide
 Şirince Information Guide
 Exploring St Johns Basilica and other ruins 
 Alert - Travel scam operating in Selçuk

İzmir
Towns in Turkey
Archaeological sites in the Aegean Region
Roman sites in Turkey
Populated places in İzmir Province
Selçuk District
Districts of İzmir Province
Former Greek towns in Turkey